Synelnykove Raion is a raion (district) of Dnipropetrovsk Oblast, southeastern-central Ukraine. Its administrative centre is located at Synelnykove. Population: .

On 18 July 2020, as part of the administrative reform of Ukraine, the number of raions of Dnipropetrovsk Oblast was reduced to seven, and the area of Synelnykove Raion was significantly expanded. Four abolished raions, Mezhova, Petropavlivka, Pokrovske, and Vasylkivka Raions, as well as the cities of Pershotravensk and Synelnykove, which were previously incorporated as cities of oblast significance and did not belong to the raion, were merged into Synelnykove Raion. The January 2020 estimate of the raion population was }

Subdivisions

Current
After the reform in July 2020, the raion consisted of 19 hromadas:
 Bohynivka rural hromada with the administration in the selo of Bohynivka, transferred from Petropavlivka Raion;
 Dubovyky rural hromada with the administration in the selo of Dubovyky, transferred from Vasylkivka Raion;
 Ilarionove settlement hromada with the administration in the urban-type settlement of Ilarionove, retained from Synelnykove Raion;
 Malomykhailivka rural hromada with the administration in the selo of Malomykhailivka, transferred from Pokrovske Raion;
 Mezhova settlement hromada with the administration in the urban-type settlement of Mezhova, transferred from Mezhova Raion;
 Mykolaivka rural hromada with the administration in the selo of Mykolaivka, transferred from Petropavlivka Raion;
 Novopavlivka rural hromada with the administration in the selo of Novopavlivka, transferred from Mezhova Raion;
 Pershotravensk urban hromada, with the administration in the city of Pershotravensk, transferred from the city of oblast significance of Pershotravensk;
 Petropavlivka settlement hromada with the administration in the urban-type settlement of Petropavlivka, transferred from Petropavlivka Raion;
 Pokrovske settlement hromada with the administration in the urban-type settlement of Pokrovske, transferred from Pokrovske Raion;
 Raivka rural hromada with the administration in the selo of Raivka, retained from Synelnykove Raion;
 Rozdory settlement hromada with the administration in the urban-type settlement of Rozdory, retained from Synelnykove Raion;
 Slavhorod settlement hromada with the administration in the urban-type settlement of Slavhorod, retained from Synelnykove Raion;
 Slovianka rural hromada with the administration in the selo of Slovianka, transferred from Mezhova Raion.
 Synelnykove urban hromada, with the administration in the city of Synelnykove, transferred from the city of oblast significance of Synelnykove;
 Ukrainske rural hromada with the administration in the settlement of Ukrainske, transferred from Petropavlivka Raion;
 Vasylkivka settlement hromada with the administration in the urban-type settlement of Vasylkivka, transferred from Vasylkivka Raion;
 Velykomykhailivka rural hromada with the administration in the selo of Velykomykhailivka, transferred from Pokrovske Raion;
 Zaitseve rural hromada with the administration in the selo of Zaitseve, retained from Synelnykove Raion.

Before 2020

Before the 2020 reform, the raion consisted of five hromadas:
 Ilarionove settlement hromada with the administration in Ilarionove;
 Raivka rural hromada with the administration in Raivka;
 Rozdory settlement hromada with the administration in Rozdory;
 Slavhorod settlement hromada with the administration in Slavhorod;
 Zaitseve rural hromada with the administration in Zaitseve.

References

Raions of Dnipropetrovsk Oblast
1923 establishments in Ukraine